The fire service in France is organised into local fire services which mostly cover the Departments of France, with a few exceptions. There are two types of fire service:
The Paris Fire Brigade (Army) and Marseille Naval Fire Battalion (Navy) are military units providing fire protection to Paris and Marseille.
The rest of France has civilian fire services organized, supervised and trained by the French Ministry of the Interior; specifically, they fall under the Civil Defence and Security Directorate (Direction Générale de la Sécurité Civile et de la Gestion de Crise, DGSCGC).

There are approximately 246,900 fire service personnel in France operating 15,642 emergency vehicles out of 6,894 emergency centres. In addition to providing fire protection and rescue, the French fire service is also one of the providers of emergency medical services.

In French, firefighters are known as sapeurs-pompiers or informally as pompiers. The former originally refers to the military-based Paris Fire Brigade. Pompier (firefighter) comes from the word for "pump", referring to the manual pumps originally used for firefighting. Sapeur means "sapper" and refers to the first official firefighting unit created by Napoleon I which was part of the military engineering arm. Firefighters in the Marseille Marine Fire Battalion are known as marins-pompiers (sailor-firefighters). The usual name of a civilian fire services is a service départemental d'incendie et de secours (SDIS) (Departmental Fire and Rescue Service). Young French citizens can fulfill the mandatory service Service national universel (SNU) in one of the fire brigades.

Organization
The fire service is organized based on the various Departments. Each department has a Service Departmentaux d'Incendie et de Secours (SDIS, Departmental Fire and Rescue Service) responsible for operations within its territory, with a few exceptions:
Paris and the three departments of the petite couronne (Hauts-de-Seine, Seine-Saint-Denis and Val-de-Marne) are covered by the Paris Fire Brigade.
Bouches-du-Rhône is covered by both the Marseille Naval Fire Battalion and a civilian Bouches-du-Rhône SDIS.
Lyon Metropolis and Rhône are both covered by the Rhône SDIS, reflecting Rhône's boundaries before 2015.
Corsica is divided between two fire services, reflecting the departments that existed from 1975 to 2017.

Fire service based Emergency Medical Services

Local fire departments also respond to medical calls, and can send an ambulance, a multi-purpose response vehicle or even a fire apparatus. Here, the cross-trained firefighters will provide on scene care and transport for injuries or illness, but are usually backed up by a SMUR unit for more serious or complex cases. Firefighters are trained to provide basic life support (BLS) level care. 

Although they also transport casualties and are, in any practical sense, ambulances, their vehicles are instead called a VSAV ( – rescue and casualty assistance vehicle). Volunteer-staffed ambulances may be called a VPS ( – first aid vehicle). The VSAV and VPS are considered to be means of bringing rescue workers and equipment onsite, with the evacuation of patients being only the logical result of the response, but not the primary duty of these response resources.

Personnel and rank insignia 
{|align=right class="wikitable"
|colspan=3 style="text-align:center;" |Personnel strength of the French Fire Services 2015
|-
! align="left" width="100" | Category
! align="left" width="100" | Status
! align="left" width="50" | Numberof fire fightersand paramedics
|-
| Civilian fire services || professionals || 40,354
|-
| Civilian fire services || volunteers|| 168,727
|-
| Volunteer fire brigades || volunteers ||13,631
|-
|Fire Services EMS ||professionalsvolunteers ||11,910
|-
| Military fire services || military ||11,752
|-
| Military fire services EMS || military|| 173
|-
|colspan=3|
|-
|colspan=3|Source:
|}
As of December 2015, there were 246,900 firefighters in France:
 78% voluntary/call firefighters
 22% career firefighters, including:
17% civilian
5% military firefighters (the Paris Fire Brigade and Marseille Naval Fire Battalion)
In addition, they employed 11,910 medical responders, and 10,900 administrative and support personnel. The jeunes sapeurs-pompiers (Junior fighters) and cadets numbered 27,800.

Civilian professional fire fighters are local government civil servants of class A, B, and C. Civil servants class A and B, and their volunteer counterparts, are trained at the National Fire College, École nationale supérieure des officiers de sapeurs-pompiers.'' Given their military origin, rank insignia follow those of the French Army.

Class C 
Professional fire fighters class C are recruited from volunteer fire fighters or youth fire fighters, age 18 or above, with three years service as Sapper without a civil service exam. Corporals can be recruited with a civil service exam open to direct entry candidates who passed middle school, and through a civil service exam open to volunteer fire fighters or youth fire fighters, with three years service. In 2017, Sapeur de 1re classe was abolished and Sapeur de 2e classe was replaced by the rank of Sapeur, except for volunteers whose grades remained unchanged.

Promotion to Corporal can occur after three years as Sapper; to Chief Corporal after five years as Corporal. Sergents are selected through a civil service exam open to team leaders. Promotion to Adjudant and Chief Adjudant can occur after four years as Sergeant/Chief Sergeant. 

Since 2013, Chief Adjutant is the highest NCO rank of most departments as the rank of Major has been abolished.

Class B 
Professional fire fighters class B are recruited through civil service exams open to direct entry candidates with a foundation degree in engineering, and to fire fighters class C with four years service, leading to employment as Lieutenant 1st class; and through a civil service exam open to fire fighters class C qualified as senior crew commanders, leading to employment as Lieutenant 2nd class. 75% of the promotions from Lieutenant 2nd class to Lieutenant 1st class are through a civil service exam open to Lieutenants 2nd class with three years in the grade; 25 % through selection from Lieutenants 2nd class with five years in the grade. 75 % of the promotions from Lieutenant 1st class to Lieutenant above class are through a civil service exam open to Lieutenants 1st class with three years in the grade; 25 % through selection from Lieutenants 1st class with five years in the grade. Direct entry lieutenants 1st class are undergoing a 32 weeks course at the French Fire College. Lieutenants 2nd class are undergoing a 12-week course at the Fire College, while Lieutenants 1st class promoted from 2nd class, are in addition undergoing a course of 6 weeks.

Class A 
Professional fire fighters class A are recruited through civil service exams open to direct entry candidates with a bachelor's degree in engineering, and to fire fighters class B qualified as sector commanders. Commandants are selected through a civil service exam from captains with three years in the grade; lieutenant-colonels from commandants with five years in the grade. Direct entry captains are undergoing a 42-week course, and internal entry captains a 10-week course, at the National Fire College.

Class A+ 
Professional fire fighters class A+ hold senior management positions, such as brigade manager, deputy brigade manager, or senior expert for the government. 

Colonels are recruited through civil service exams open to fire fighters class A qualified as area managers. The laureates are undergoing a 32-week course at the National Fire College.

Colonels hors-classe are selected from colonels with four years in the grade; contrôleurs généraux from colonels hors-classe with at least 8 years of experience as brigade manager, senior manager for the government, or similar positions that are listed by a decree.

The contrôleur général insignia has 2 pyres. However, some officers who handle special responsibilities within the government can have a 3 pyres insignia.

Responses 
In 2015, the French fire services responded to 4,453,300 incidents, most of which were medical:

Fires 300,700
Traffic collisions 279,400
Medical emergencies 3,413,300
Technologic emergencies 53,200
Other 406,700

Paris and Marseille comprise 10% of the national total.

See also

Emergency medical services in France

References

External links
  Official website (French Ministry of the Interior)
  National federation of French firefighters

 
Society of France
 
Emergency management in France
Emergency medical services in France